5-Chloromethylfurfural is an organic compound with the formula C4H2O(CH2Cl)CHO.  It consists of a furan substituted at the 2- and 5-positions with formyl (CHO) and chloromethyl (CH2Cl) groups.  CMF, as it is called, is obtained by dehydration of fructose and other cellulose derivatives using hydrochloric acid.  It is a colourless liquid.   It can be reduced to give 5-methylfurfural, and can be hydrolyzed to give hydroxymethylfurfural.

References

Organochlorides
Furfurals